Founded in 1994, Parkways Foundation was the non-profit, philanthropic partner of the Chicago Park District.  Parkways sought private investment to enrich the physical and cultural landscape of Chicago's neighborhood parks.  The foundation was led by its board of directors and supported by over 200 board members including Chicago's corporate and philanthropic leaders.  Parkways invested in capital projects, youth cultural and sports programs, and historic preservation in Chicago's neighborhood parks.  Parkways projects focused on underserved neighborhoods for the enrichment of the lives of children and families.  

Projects included:
Washington Park Playground
Columbus Park Playground- Chicago's first Boundless Playground for children of all abilities
Inferno Mobile Recording Studio
Alvin Ailey Dance Camp
2 adaptive camps for children with disabilities
Day Camp and after school scholarships
Community Garden Grant

Parkways closed on August 31, 2012.

References

Parks in Chicago
Non-profit organizations based in Chicago
1994 establishments in Illinois